Mimacraea paragora is a butterfly in the family Lycaenidae. It is found in Cameroon and the Democratic Republic of the Congo.

Subspecies
 Mimacraea paragora paragora (Cameroon, Democratic Republic of the Congo: north-west of Lake Tanganyika)
 Mimacraea paragora angulata Libert, 2000 (Democratic Republic of the Congo)

References

 
 

Butterflies described in 1911
Poritiinae
Taxa named by Hans Rebel